Beck Gilmer-Osborne aka B.G-Osborne (born 1991) is a queer, bigender, Transmedia artist, and settler of Scottish and British descent who was raised in rural Ontario, and currently lives in Newfoundland. Their practice deploys photography, video, installation, print media, and performance, and engages with archival practices, questions of embodiment, trans representation, gender-variance as a tool to deconstruct and revise while also using family photo archives as a way to explore mental health and family secrets.

Early life and education 
B.G-Osborne grew up in rural Ontario, on treaty 20 territory. They graduated from NSCAD in 2014 with a BFA in Intermedia. In 2018 they undertook a Masters of Information Studies in the Archival Studies program at McGill University.

A Thousand Cuts 
A Thousand Cuts is their award-winning three-channel video installation which weaves together scenes from 48 films, 34 television series, and a music video, in which cisgender actors play transgender characters. The title is a reference to the phrase "death by a thousand cuts" to allude to the video "cut" and the way popular culture media has misrepresented trans people, contributing to anti-trans violence. The work was publicly censored in 2018 by Arts Common while on view in The New Gallery’s +15 Window on the basis that folks had complained about swearing and nudity. The artist wrote an open letter to the offended viewers and despite attempts by The New Gallery to challenge the decision, find a compromise solution, and foster dialogue, ultimately the work was removed. The controversy brought significant attention the work which subsequently went on to be screened in numerous other galleries.

Awards 
In 2019 B. G-Osborne was selected by BackFlash Magazine as the annual Optic Nerve Image Contest winner.

References 

Canadian LGBT artists
Canadian photographers
Canadian video artists
Living people
1991 births
21st-century Canadian LGBT people